Jak Jones (born 29 July 1993) is a Welsh professional snooker player.

Jones was born in Cwmbran, Wales.  He became a professional in 2010 at the age of 16, by winning the 2010 European Under 19 Snooker Championship in Malta.

Career

Professional debut
In his first year on the tour, Jones only won one match in his attempts to qualify for the seven ranking events. He played in all 12 of the minor-ranking Players Tour Championship (PTC) events throughout the year, with his best results being two last 32 defeats, and was placed 85th on the PTC Order of Merit. He ended his debut season ranked world number 94, meaning he was relegated from the tour as he did not finish inside the top 64.

2011/2012 season
Having dropped off the tour, Jones could only enter PTC events; he played in 10 of the 12. At the second event he beat Anthony Hamilton 4–3, James Wattana 4–2 and Sam Craigie 4–1 to reach the last 16, where he was edged out 3–4 by Rory McLeod. Two other last 32 defeats saw Jones finish 75th on the PTC Order of Merit.

2012/2013 season
Jones played in seven out of twelve PTC events during the 2012–13 season. He won a total of three matches and was ranked 106th on the Order of Merit. He earned a place in the EBSA Qualifying Tour Play-offs by finishing number 2 in the rankings and winning the Scottish Amateur Open. He beat Elliot Slessor 4–2 and John Parkin 4–0 to claim a place back on the snooker tour for the 2013–14 season.

2013/2014 season
Jones lost all 16 matches he played in the 2013–14 season, meaning that he finished with a world ranking of 128.

2014/2015 season
Jones qualified for the Australian Goldfields Open by edging past Joe O'Connor 5–4: it was his first win on the main tour in 18 months. He was beaten 5–1 by Nigel Bond in the subsequent round. In the second round of the Riga Open he recorded the biggest win of his career by knocking out world number one Neil Robertson 4–3, before losing by a reverse of this scoreline to Sean O'Sullivan. He later finished 67th on the Order of Merit. He did not win more than one match at any other event during the rest of the season until the World Championship, when he defeated Aditya Mehta 10–7 and Jack Lisowski 10–5. This meant that Jones was just one victory away from qualifying for the biggest event on the snooker calendar. He recovered from 4–0 down against Ryan Day to level at 6–6. However, he then lost four frames in a row to be beaten 10–6. He fell off the tour at the end of the season as he was the world number 95, outside the top 64 who retain their places.

2015/2016 season
Jones did not play in a single professional event during the 2015–16 season, but by beating Jamie Clarke 7–4 in the final of the 2016 EBSA European Championship he earned a two-year main tour card.

2016/2017 season
Jones beat Jamie Cope 4–3 at the Riga Masters, before being thrashed 4–0 by Mark Williams. He defeated Brandon Sargeant 4–0 and Elliot Slessor 4–3 at the English Open, then recorded a shock 4–2 win over Ding Junhui, a player ranked 105 places above him, despite having a high break of 34. Jones was 3–1 up on Anthony Hamilton in the fourth round, but lost 4–3. At the International Championship he saw off Jimmy Robertson 6–4 and was then defeated 6–2 by John Higgins in the second round. Jones reached the fourth round at the Shoot-Out, before being defeated by Shaun Murphy.

He dropped off the tour at the end of the 2017/18 season but entered Q School in an attempt to win back a place, and secured his return to the tour at the first event.

Performance and rankings timeline

Career finals

Amateur finals: 4 (2 titles)

References

External links

Jak Jones at worldsnooker.com
 
 Profile on Global Snooker
 Profile on Snooker Database

1993 births
Living people
Welsh snooker players
Sportspeople from Cwmbran